is a Japanese light novel series written by Reiji Kaitō and illustrated by Ruroo. Media Factory has published seventeen volumes under their MF Bunko J imprint from November 2009 to July 2017. A manga adaptation by Hakaru Takagi began serialization in Media Factory's Monthly Comic Alive magazine in 2010. A 12-episode anime television series adaptation aired in Japan between October 7 and December 23, 2013 and is licensed by Crunchyroll (formerly known as Funimation) outside of Japan.

Plot

In an alternate historical version of the United Kingdom in the early 20th century, scientists have created a mixture of technology and sorcery known as Machinart, circuits made from spells that are put into objects to bring them to life and give them artificial intelligence. These Automatons were developed as a military weapon and spread throughout the world; the humans in charge of them became known as puppeteers.

A puppeteer named Raishin Akabane comes from Japan to Liverpool to study at Walpurgis Royal Academy of Machinart, along with his automaton Yaya. Once every four years, the Academy holds the "Night Party", a competition where puppeteers use their automatons to fight in hopes of obtaining the title of "Wiseman". Raishin, however, enters the school and the competition in order to get revenge on a mysterious genius who killed the other members of Raishin's family.

Media

Light novels
Unbreakable Machine-Doll began as a light novel series, written by Reiji Kaitō and illustrated by Ruroo. The first volume was published by Media Factory under their MF Bunko J imprint on November 21, 2009. The last, seventeenth volume was published on July 25, 2017. A drama CD was released with a special edition of the fourth volume. In June 2017 Kadokawa released a commercial promoting the end of the series.

Unbreakable Machine-Doll 

Unbreakable Machine-Doll Additional Stories

Manga
A manga adaptation by Hakaru Takagi began serialization in Media Factory's Monthly Comic Alive magazine in its June 2010 issue, published on April 27, 2010. Its first tankōbon volume was released on November 22, 2010, and there have been nine volumes published as of March 23, 2016. A drama CD was released with a special edition of the first volume. A spin-off manga series, titled  by Misato Kamada was published in Media Factory's Monthly Comic Gene between April 15, 2013 and April 15, 2014. Its first tankōbon volume was released on September 27, 2013. and the second and last on May 27, 2014.

Unbreakable Machine-Doll 

Gene Metallica: Unbreakable Machine-Doll Re:Acta

Anime
A 12-episode anime television series adaptation, produced by studio Lerche, aired in Japan between October 7 and December 23, 2013. The series appeared first on AT-X and later on Tokyo MX, ytv, TV Aichi and BS11. Funimation simulcasted the series on their video portal. The series is directed by Kinji Yoshimoto and written by Yūko Kakihara, with character designs by Atsuko Watanabe and music by Masaru Yokoyama. The series covers the first three novels.

Episode list

Home media

Web Radio
The Radio Unbreakable Machine-Doll Main cast, Web radio program that had been delivered up to February 25, 2014, from September 3, 2013, at animate TV and sound fountain. Hiro Shimono (Akabane Raishin), Hitomi Harada (Yaya), and Megumi Takamoto (Charlotte Belew).

Video games
Unbreakable Machine-Doll Facing “Burnt Red” was released for Android and iOS on December 6, 2013. "3D Battle-type flick" a new sense optimized operation of the smartphone and reproduced in full 3D graphics battle scene features. Game proceeds to the two axis and "Battle" to advance the story, the "unit" make the organization and strengthening of automaton. Expand the original story by Reiji Kaitō supervision of authorship. The game features a new original character named Kaguya, voiced by Nao Touyama, and features the theme song "Burnt Red" sung by Hitomi Harada. The game has been terminated on the last day of service as of 30 January 2015.

See also
 Mushi-Uta, another light novel series illustrated by the same illustrator.
 Oreshura, another light novel series illustrated by the same illustrator.
 Reincarnated as a Sword, another light novel series illustrated by the same illustrator.

References

External links

  
 

2009 Japanese novels
2010 manga
2013 manga
2013 anime television series debuts
Action anime and manga
Anime and manga based on light novels
Funimation
Kadokawa Dwango franchises
Lerche (studio)
Light novels
Media Factory manga
Medialink
MF Bunko J
Seinen manga
Shōjo manga
Tokyo MX original programming
Novels set in Liverpool
British Empire in fiction
Novels set in the 20th century
Harem anime and manga